Bangladesh Water Development Board is a government agency which is responsible for surface water and ground water management in Bangladesh and is located in Dhaka. As of 2023, Md. Mahbur Rahman is the director general of the board.

History
In 1954 to 1956 there were a series of consecutive floods in East Pakistan. J A Crug, US state department official lead a mission to investigate and recommend solutions. On their recommendation East Pakistan Water and Power Development Authority was formed for water management. After the Independence of Bangladesh, the authority was split into Bangladesh Water Development Board and Bangladesh Power Development Board. It is under the Ministry of Water Resources. It manages irrigation canals and prevent river erosion.

See also 
 Char Development and Settlement Project

References

1972 establishments in Bangladesh
Government agencies of Bangladesh
Organisations based in Dhaka
Water organizations
Water supply and sanitation in Bangladesh
Water management authorities in Bangladesh